Norio Nishiyama  is a Japanese mixed martial artist. He competed in the Flyweight and Bantamweight divisions between 1999 and 2000.

Mixed martial arts record

|-
| Loss
| align=center| 2-2-1
| Masaki Nishizawa
| Decision (unanimous)
| Shooto: R.E.A.D. 7
| 
| align=center| 2
| align=center| 5:00
| Setagaya, Tokyo, Japan
| 
|-
| Loss
| align=center| 2-2-1
| Yoshinobu Ota
| Technical Submission (rear-naked choke)
| Shooto: R.E.A.D. 2
| 
| align=center| 1
| align=center| 0:28
| Tokyo, Japan
| 
|-
| Win
| align=center| 2-1-1
| Takeyasu Hirono
| Decision (unanimous)
| Shooto: R.E.A.D. 1
| 
| align=center| 2
| align=center| 5:00
| Tokyo, Japan
| 
|-
| Win
| align=center| 1-1-1
| Hiroki Kita
| Decision (unanimous)
| Shooto: Shooter's Ambition
| 
| align=center| 2
| align=center| 5:00
| Setagaya, Tokyo, Japan
| 
|-
| Loss
| align=center| 0-1-1
| Yoshinobu Ota
| Decision (unanimous)
| Shooto: Renaxis 3
| 
| align=center| 2
| align=center| 5:00
| Setagaya, Tokyo, Japan
| 
|-
| Draw
| align=center| 0-0-1
| Mitsuhiro Sakamoto
| Draw
| Shooto: Shooter's Passion
| 
| align=center| 2
| align=center| 5:00
| Setagaya, Tokyo, Japan
|

See also
List of male mixed martial artists

References

External links
 
 Kazuhiro Kusayanagi at mixedmartialarts.com
 Kazuhiro Kusayanagi at fightmatrix.com

Japanese male mixed martial artists
Flyweight mixed martial artists
Bantamweight mixed martial artists
Living people
Year of birth missing (living people)